The 1997–98 NBA season was the Grizzlies' third season in the National Basketball Association. After finishing with the worst record in their first two seasons, the Grizzlies selected Antonio Daniels out of Bowling Green State University with the fourth overall pick in the 1997 NBA draft. In the off-season, the team hired Brian Hill as their new head coach; Hill previously coached the Orlando Magic, and led them to the 1995 NBA Finals, where they lost in four straight games to the Houston Rockets. The team also acquired Otis Thorpe from the Detroit Pistons, acquired three-point specialist Sam Mack from the Houston Rockets, and acquired Tony Massenburg from the Boston Celtics. 

The Grizzlies played around .500 early into the season with a 6–7 start, but then struggled again posting a 13-game losing streak between December and January, and held a 13–36 record at the All-Star break. At midseason, Thorpe was traded back to his former team, the Sacramento Kings in exchange for Michael Smith and Bobby Hurley, while Anthony Peeler was dealt to the Minnesota Timberwolves in exchange for Doug West. The Grizzlies finally escaped last place by finishing sixth in the Midwest Division with a 19–63 record.

Leading the way in scoring again was second-year star Shareef Abdur-Rahim, who averaged 22.3 points and 7.1 rebounds per game, while Bryant Reeves averaged 16.3 points and 7.9 rebounds per game, Mack and sixth man Blue Edwards both contributed 10.8 points per game each, and Daniels provided the team with 7.8 points and 4.5 assists per game. In addition, George Lynch provided with 7.5 points and 4.4 rebounds per game off the bench, and Lee Mayberry contributed 4.6 points and 4.4 assists per game, after replacing Daniels as the team's starting point guard midway through the season. Following the season, Daniels was traded to the San Antonio Spurs, while Edwards signed as a free agent with the Miami Heat during the next season, Lynch signed with the Philadelphia 76ers, and Hurley was released to free agency.

For the season, the Grizzlies added new black alternate road uniforms with turquoise side panels, which would become their primary road jerseys for the 2000–01 season.

Draft picks
The Grizzlies first draft pick was Antonio Daniels, which was the fourth overall pick in the draft.

Roster

Roster Notes
 Shooting guard Doug West was acquired from the Minnesota Timberwolves at midseason, but did not play for the Grizzlies this season due to going into rehab for alcohol treatment, and a hip contusion.

Regular season
The Grizzlies got off to their best start in team history, as thirteen games into the season, the team had a 6–7 record. On October 31, 1997, Violet Palmer made history in Vancouver when she officiated the NBA season opener between the Vancouver Grizzlies and the Dallas Mavericks, in British Columbia, Canada. The team would then fall into a slump, which included a thirteen-game losing streak as they fell out of playoff contention.  Vancouver would finish the year with a 19–63 record, their best in team history, and finish out of last place for the first time ever.

Highs
 Vancouver recorded their first ever three game winning streak, as on January 20, they defeated the Denver Nuggets, followed by sweeping a home and home series against the Golden State Warriors.
 On March 23, 1998, Vancouver defeated the Los Angeles Clippers 106–95 to earn their sixteenth win of the season, a team record.  Vancouver finished with nineteen wins, four higher than their previous high of fifteen, set in 1995–96.
 The Grizzlies finished out of the Midwest Division cellar for the first time in team history, as they had a 19–63 record, eight games better than the Denver Nuggets, who finished the year 11–71.

Lows
 On January 15, 1998, the Washington Wizards defeat Vancouver 112–110, sending the Grizzlies to their thirteenth consecutive loss.
 From January 27 to April 5, the Grizzlies win only 3 of 31 games.

Season standings

Record vs. opponents

Game log

Player statistics

Season
 team leaders

Awards and records

Transactions
Vancouver acquired forward-center Otis Thorpe in a trade with the Detroit Pistons. The Grizzlies gave up a conditional first round draft pick.  Vancouver also acquired Sam Mack from the Houston Rockets to become the team's starting shooting guard. Midway through the season, Thorpe was traded along with Chris Robinson to the Sacramento Kings for Michael Smith and Bobby Hurley.

The Grizzlies hired Brian Hill to become the head coach.  Hill had previously been the head coach of the Orlando Magic from 1993 to 1997, leading them to a 191–104 record under his helm.  The Magic advanced to the 1995 NBA Finals and had a 60 win season in 1995–96.

References

 Grizzlies on Database Basketball
 Grizzlies on Basketball Reference

Van
Vancouver Grizzlies seasons